David W. Hein is an American professor and scientist.  He currently is a Distinguished University Scholar at the University of Louisville where he serves as the Peter K. Knoefel Endowed Chair of Pharmacology and Professor & Chair of the Department of Pharmacology & Toxicology.

Life and education
Hein was born in Faith, South Dakota and attended Wisconsin Lutheran High School in Milwaukee, Wisconsin.  He completed his undergraduate work at the University of Wisconsin-Eau Claire where he received a B.S. in chemistry.  He completed his PhD in pharmacology at the University of Michigan.

Career
Hein began his career at the Morehouse School of Medicine where he chaired the Department of Pharmacology.  In 1989 he was appointed as Professor and Chair of the Department of Pharmacology and Toxicology at the University of North Dakota where he became a Chester Fritz Distinguished Professor.   In 1997, Hein moved to the University of Louisville where he serves as the Peter K. Knoefel Professor and Chair of the Department  of Pharmacology & Toxicology and Distinguished University Scholar. Additionally, he has presented the Astor Visiting Lectureship at the University of Oxford and serves as a visiting professor at the University of Paris. He was elected to the Academy of Pharmacology Educators of the American Society for Pharmacology and Experimental Therapeutics.

Research
Hein's research in molecular epidemiology helps identify people genetically susceptible to developing cancer from environmental and occupational chemicals, which allows for focus on treatment and prevention. Additionally, his research in genomics sheds light on the genetic causes for prescription drug failure. Widely published in scientific journals, Hein has authored more than 275 articles with a h- index of 67.  His work has been cited more than 16000 times.

References

Living people
American scientists
University of Michigan College of Pharmacy alumni
People from Louisville, Kentucky
People from Faith, South Dakota
Scientists from Milwaukee
University of Wisconsin–Eau Claire alumni
Year of birth missing (living people)